The discography of American singer-songwriter Lesley Gore consists of 13 studio albums, 6 compilation albums, and 37 singles.

Albums

Studio albums

Compilation albums

Singles

Notes

References 

 
 
Gore, Leslie
Gore, Leslie